The Last Polka is a 1985 comedy television film. It was written by and starred John Candy and Eugene Levy, and directed by John Blanchard.

The Last Polka follows the life, careers, and the final concert of Yosh (Candy) and Stan (Levy) Shmenge, two brothers from the fictional country of Leutonia who become the biggest polka duo the world has ever seen. It is presented as a mixture of live concert performance and filmed scenes.

Many fellow SCTV performers including Rick Moranis, Catherine O'Hara, and Robin Duke appear in the film. Dave Thomas narrates.

The live concert in the film is a loose parody of The Band's concert movie The Last Waltz.  Special guests and longtime Shmenge collaborators include The Lemon Twins (Duke, O'Hara and her real life sister Mary Margaret O'Hara) doing a medley of their "hits" and also Linsk Minyk (Moranis) performing a medley of road songs that culminates in a version of the Doors' "Touch Me".

One scene has The Shmenges performing an outdoor stadium Michael Jackson salute concert, complete with glitter outfits, sequin glove, and a polka version of "Beat It".

The Shmenges were originally created as characters for the television series Second City TV and were also known on SCTV as The Happy Wanderers.

The Last Polka was produced for and first broadcast on the HBO cable network. Both John Candy and Eugene Levy were nominated in 1985 for a Cable Ace Award in the Best Performance in a Comedy Special category.

External links

 
NY TIMES Archives - TV Review
NY TIMES Archives - New On Video

English-language Canadian films
Canadian musical comedy films
Canadian mockumentary films
1980s musical comedy films
Canadian comedy television films
1985 television films
1985 films
Films with screenplays by Eugene Levy
1980s Canadian films